Emma Frances Riggs Campbell ( – ) was an American hymnwriter and author.  She is best known for her hymn "Jesus of Nazareth Passeth By". 

Her sister Catherine Smith Campbell married future Florida governor Ossian Bingley Hart. 

Campbell graduated from the Packer Institute for Girls in Brooklyn, New York in 1959.  She and a sister opened a school in Morristown, New Jersey in the 1860s.  Campbell also taught Sunday school for 37 years at the First Presbyterian Church in Morristown.

"Jesus of Nazareth Passeth By" was inspired by an 1864 religious revival in Newark held by the Rev. Edward Payson Hammond, specifically a sermon mentioning Luke 18:37 and the story of Jesus healing the blind Bartimaeus.   Campbell's hymn was first published using the Greek letter Eta as a pseudonym, which has led to Campbell being misidentified as Eta or Etta Campbell.   The hymn was anthologized numerous times and was frequently performed by the gospel singer Ira D. Sankey.

Campbell published several other hymns, a collection of verse, several children's novels, and a short biography of her brother-in-law Ossian Hart.

Emma F. R. Campbell died on 25 February 1919 in Morristown.

Bibliography 
 Paul Preston; or, Who is the Hero? (1864)
 Green Pastures (1866)
 Better than Rubies; or, Mabel's Treasure (1869)
 Toward the Mark (1875)
 Biographical Sketch of Honorable Ossian B. Hart, Late Governor of Florida, 1873 (1901)
 The Hymn "Jesus of Nazareth passeth by" and Its History, and Other Verses (1909)

References 

Created via preloaddraft
1830 births
1919 deaths
People from Morristown, New Jersey
People from Newark, New Jersey
American hymnwriters
American women writers